Alexandra Valerie "Alex" Wester (born 21 March 1994) is a German athlete specialising in the long jump. She made her major competition debut at the 2016 World Indoor Championships finishing sixth.

She was born in The Gambia to a German father and a Ghanaian mother. Earlier in her career, she competed in combined events but decided to specialise in the long jump after problems with injuries.

Her personal bests in the event are 6.79 metres outdoors (Oberteuringen 2016) and 6.95 metres indoors (Berlin 2016).

Competition record

References

External links
 
 
 

1994 births
Living people
German sportspeople of Ghanaian descent
German female long jumpers
Miami Hurricanes women's track and field athletes
Place of birth missing (living people)
Athletes (track and field) at the 2016 Summer Olympics
Olympic athletes of Germany